The 1998 ADAC Deutsche Super Touren Wagen-Cup was the fifth edition of the Super Tourenwagen Cup (STW).

Season summary
After an open start to the season with four different winners in the first four races, BMW driver Johnny Cecotto and reigning champion and Peugeot driver Laurent Aïello soon emerged as the two championship contenders. Cecotto built up a sizeable lead during the season, but a late four-race winning streak ahead of the final weekend helped Aiello close the gap. After finishing third in the sprint race at the final event, one place ahead of Cecotto, Aiello passed Cecotto in the championship and led his Venezuelan rival by a single point before the deciding feature race. In that race, Cecotto would go on to finish fourth, two places ahead of Aiello, allowing him to claim the title.

Teams and drivers

 M Drivers eligible to score points in the Manufactures Trophy
 T Drivers eligible to score points in the Team Trophy

Race calendar and results

Championship results

Manufacturers' Trophy

External links 

Super Tourenwagen Cup
Super Tourerwagen